Ronald Lorgio Suárez Saucedo (born 5 December 1990 in Santa Cruz de la Sierra) commonly known as Lorgio Suarez, is a Bolivian professional footballer who currently plays in the Liga de Futbol Profesional Boliviano for Blooming. He is a centre back. He has also appeared for and captained the Bolivian national U-15, U-17 and U-20 teams.

Career
Suárez began his career at Ramón Tahuichi Aguilera's football academy. In February 2008, while playing in an international tournament with Tahuichi, he was spotted by talent scouts who recruited him for Universidad de Chile, where he spent 10 months training in the youth team. The following year, after the 2009 South American U-20 Championship, he returned to Bolivia and signed for his hometown club Oriente Petrolero. He showed good form, and was included in the starting line-up by coach Gustavo Quinteros, winning a league title the following season, which enabled him to play in the Copa Sudamericana. In December 2010, after Quinteros had departed to coach the national team, he resigned his contract and joined Blooming, arriving alongside goalkeeper Sergio Galarza.

Suárez earned caps for Bolivia in the U-15, U-17 and served as captain in the U-20 level. However, he has not yet appeared for the Bolivia national team.

Honours

Club
Oriente Petrolero
 Primera División (1): 2010

References

External links
 Lorgio Suárez at Football-Lineups
 
 
 
 Lorgio Suárez Amonestado 

1990 births
Living people
Sportspeople from Santa Cruz de la Sierra
Bolivian footballers
Bolivian expatriate footballers
Club Blooming players
Oriente Petrolero players
Universidad de Chile footballers
Expatriate footballers in Chile
Bolivia international footballers
Association football defenders